Royal James Kahler (March 22, 1918 – February 21, 2005) was a player in the National Football League.

Biography
Kahler was born on March 22, 1918 in Grand Island, Nebraska.

Career
Kahler was drafted in the fifth round of the 1941 NFL Draft by the Philadelphia Eagles, but his rights were transferred to the Pittsburgh Steelers due to the events later referred to as the Pennsylvania Polka. He played for the Steelers in 1941. The following season, he played with the Green Bay Packers.

He played at the collegiate level at the University of Nebraska-Lincoln.

See also
List of Pittsburgh Steelers players
List of Green Bay Packers players

References

External links

1918 births
2005 deaths
People from Grand Island, Nebraska
Pittsburgh Steelers players
Green Bay Packers players
Nebraska Cornhuskers football players